The Tainan University of Technology (TUT), also known as Tainan Tech (台南科大; ; pinyin: Táinán Kēdà), is a private university serving approximately 10,000 students in the Tainan metropolitan area in southern Taiwan. The main campus sits in Yongkang District of Tainan.

History
The school, founded in 1964 to provide professional training for women, opened its doors in 1965 as the Private Tainan Junior College of Home Economics. The school subsequently became the Tainan Women's College of Arts and Technology (1997–2006). As the Tainan University of Technology (2007) it graduated its first male students.

Tainan Tech is historically strong in the fields of music, visual art, arts technology, education, finance, product design and fashion design. Since 2002 the school has added graduate programs in music, business management, art and applied sciences.

The campus is famed for its international horticulture and outdoor art. The landscaping facilitates a commencement ritual: a circumnavigation of the campus by graduates, who process through a series of floral trellises and, finally, under a line of decorated arches held aloft by younger classmates.

Faculties
 College of Arts
 College of Design
 College of Living Technology
 College of Management
 College of Tourism

See also
 List of universities in Taiwan

References

External links
Official Site: Tainan University of Technology (Chinese, English)

1965 establishments in Taiwan
Educational institutions established in 1965
Universities and colleges in Tainan
Yongkang District
Scientific organizations based in Taiwan
Universities and colleges in Taiwan
Technical universities and colleges in Taiwan